Muhammad Faris bin Ramli (born 24 August 1992) is a Singaporean professional footballer who plays as a forward for Singapore Premier League club Tampines Rovers, and the Singapore national team. Faris plays primarily as a winger. In 2012, Faris made it to the top 52 of Nike's 'The Chance' competition, a worldwide talent hunt for young players. However, he was not drafted in the selection of the final 16 in Barcelona. Faris played for the Young Lions prior to featuring for LionsXII in the Malaysia Super League.

Early life and education 
Faris studied in Loyang Primary School and Loyang Secondary School.

Club career

Young Lions
Faris began his professional football career with Under-23 side Young Lions in the S.League in 2010.

LionsXII
In December 2012, the FAS announced that Faris was to join the LionsXII for the 2013 Malaysia Super League (MSL). He had his most prolific season yet in 2015, scoring 11 goals in all competitions, 8 in the MSL and 2 in the 2015 Malaysia FA Cup, which was won by the LionsXII, and 1 in the 2015 Malaysia Cup. He had scored the first goal in the 3–1 win over Kelatan that brought the Malaysia FA Cup to Singapore. His 8 goals in the league was good enough to see him finish the season as the LionsXII's top scorer in the MSL.

Home United
In 2016, although courted by high spending Tampines Rovers as well as MSL clubs Pahang and Selangor, Faris signed for Home United for the 2016 S.League campaign after the LionsXII was disbanded following the conclusion of the 2015 MSL season. However, following the heights of 2015, Faris was brought down to earth by a disappointing 2016 as he was constantly plagued by injuries.

Although he was once again wooed by some MSL sides, Faris chose to extend his contract with Home. He started the 2017 season in sensation form, scoring 3 goals in 4 appearances in the league for Home. He also has a further 4 goals in 6 games in the 2017 AFC Cup, helping his team become the first team to qualify for the zonal semi-finals. The 9-3 thrashing of Brunei DPMM has to be his best game of the season as he scored 4 and assisted another 4. He eventually finished as the joint local top-scorer of the league with Shahril Ishak, amassing 11 goals in the league. In total, Faris had a standout 2017, scoring 21 goals and notching 21 assists in all competitions, earning him an S.League Player of the Year nomination.

PKNS
On 5 January 2018, Faris signed a contract with Malaysia Super League club PKNS. He scored his first goal for his new club in a 3–4 defeat to Kedah FA. He had a good first season with PKNS, finishing joint-second top scorer for his team with 6 league goals to his name.

Perlis Northern Lions
After speculations of a move to Perak, in January 2019, Faris signed a contract with newly promoted Malaysia Premier League club Perlis Northern Lions F.C. He was also linked up again with former PKNS FC teammates Safee Sali as well as Khyril Muhymeen, whom joined the club in December 2018. However, after revelation of Perlis financial difficulties and subsequent exclusion from the Malaysian league, Faris opted to terminate his contract in January 2019.

Hougang United
After Faris terminated his contract with Perlis, he returned to Singapore and sign with Singapore Premier League side Hougang United. On 21 April 2019, He made his debut in the opening match and scored his first goal in penalty against Tampines Rovers in a 5–1 defeat.

Faris was consistent in the year and was the top local-born goal scorer in the 2019 Singapore Premier League season, winning the Player of the Year award.

Terengganu
After leaving Hougang United, Faris signed for Terengganu for 2020 season. He made only 6 appearances for the club.

Lion City Sailors
Faris signed for Lion City Sailors after leaving Terengganu. He won the league with the Sailors for the 2021 season.

Faris’ 2022 campaign begun on a sour note as he missed out on the first game against Hougang United due to contracting COVID 19. It was only until the Sailors’ 10th league match when manager Kim Do-Hoon gave Faris his first start of the season in the league. He scored his first goal of the season against Balestier Khalsa in June 2022 but remained largely used as a substitute until Kim left the club in August. His successor, Luka Lalic, also used Faris as a substitute in his first two games, in which Faris bagged 2 assists apiece. Faris managed to make the starting lineup in the next game against Hougang United, in which he scored 2 goals in a 9-4 thrashing. However, as the Sailors suffered a massive dip in form in the closing stages of the season, Faris, too, struggled badly, missing several crucial chances. In the penultimate round of the league, he was told that he would be leaving the Sailors next season. Faris managed to score a brace against Young Lions on the final day of the SPL 2022, ending off his 2022 league campaign with the Sailors with just 5 goals.

The Sailors remained sinking in the domestic cup tournament. While Faris did well to score in the first cup match against Balestier Khalsa, the Sailors were knocked out at the group stage after a defeat against Albirex Niigata. Faris ended off his LCS journey with a marvellous goal against Borussia Dortmund in a friendly - a farewell goal of sorts.

Tampines Rovers
Faris signed for Tampines at the beginning of 2023. In his first 4 games with Tampines, he have been in the starting 11 and have scored a goal in each of the four matches and is currently the joint-top scorer in the SPL with Balestier’s Ryoya Taniguchi.

International career
Faris made his first international debut on 9 September 2014 against Hong Kong. He scored his first international goal against Cambodia on 17 November 2014. By early March 2017, he had garnered 29 caps for Singapore.

In the AFF Suzuki Cup in 2021, Faris made the front page for his stoppage-time penalty miss. Had Faris scored, Singapore would have defeated Indonesia and move on to the finals. However, the penalty miss ultimately caused 9-man Singapore to fall 4-2 to Indonesia after extra time, which caused some frustration amongst Singaporeans.

In the 2022 edition, Faris failed to score despite two good opportunities against Laos, causing much widespread criticism. While he managed to register his first goal of the tournament against Malaysia, Singapore would still go down 4-1.

Others

Singapore Selection squad
He was selected as part of the Singapore Selection squad for The Sultan of Selangor's Cup to be held on 6 May 2017.

Selangor Selection squad
As a player of PKNS in the 2018 Malaysia Super League season, Faris was selected as part of the Selangor Selection squad for the 2018 Sultan of Selangor's Cup that was held at the Shah Alam Stadium. He came on as a substitute for his PKNS teammate, Zac Anderson on the 60th minute. Selangor eventually won the match 1-1 (5-3) on penalties after he scored the winning penalty.

Career statistics

Club

. Caps and goals may not be correct.

 Young Lions and LionsXII are ineligible for qualification to AFC competitions in their respective leagues.
 Young Lions withdrew from the 2011 and 2012 Singapore Cup, and the 2011 Singapore League Cup due to participation in AFC and AFF youth competitions.

International

International goals 
As of match played 5 September 2019. Singapore score listed first, score column indicates score after each Ramli goal.

U22 International goals
Scores and results list Singapore's goal tally first.

Honours

Club
LionsXII
Malaysia Super League: 2013
FA Cup Malaysia: 2015

Lion City Sailors
Singapore Premier League: 2021

Personal
Singapore Premier League Player of the Year: 2019

References

External links 
 

Living people
1992 births
Temasek Polytechnic alumni
Singaporean footballers
Singapore international footballers
Singaporean expatriate footballers
LionsXII players
Singapore Premier League players
Singaporean people of Malay descent
Association football wingers
Malaysia Super League players
Young Lions FC players
Footballers at the 2014 Asian Games
Southeast Asian Games bronze medalists for Singapore
Southeast Asian Games medalists in football
Competitors at the 2013 Southeast Asian Games
Competitors at the 2019 Southeast Asian Games
Asian Games competitors for Singapore
Singapore youth international footballers